Monique Riekewald (born 3 August 1979 in Suhl) is a German skeleton racer who has competed since 1997. She won a gold medal in the mixed bobsleigh-skeleton team event at the 2007 FIBT World Championships in St. Moritz.

References
 FIBT profile
 Mixed bobsleigh-skeleton world championship medalists since 2007
 Official website 
 Skeletonsport.com profile

External links
 

1979 births
Living people
German female skeleton racers
People from Suhl
Sportspeople from Thuringia
20th-century German women
21st-century German women